Kirika may refer to:

Fictional characters 
 Kirika Yuumura, in the Japanese anime TV series Noir
 Kirika, in the comic book Age of Apocalypse
 Kirika, alias Sayoko Tsukikage, in the metaseries Kousoku Sentai Turboranger
 Kirika Kagarigi, in the Japanese manga Kagihime Monogatari Eikyū Alice Rondo 
 Kirika Karasuma, in the Japanese manga Kamichama Karin
 Kirika Tachibana, in the Japanese light novel series Kaze no Stigma
 Kirika Misono, in the Japanese manga series Eiken
 Kirika Akatsuki, in the Japanese anime television franchise Symphogear

Other uses
 Wally Kirika (b. 1982-10-27), sprinter
 Kirika, Bisoro, a colline of Burundi